Harry Babcock may refer to:

 Harry Babcock (pole vaulter) (1890–1965), American pole vaulter
 Harry Babcock (American football) (1930–1996), American football end

See also
 Harold D. Babcock (1882–1968), American astronomer